Cubijello del Sitio is a district in the Spanish municipality of Molina de Aragon of the province of Guadalajara

Description 

The town belongs to the Guadalaran province of the Molina de Aragon, which itself belongs to the autonomous community of Castilla-La Mancha. The town has a population of 11 people. It was once referred to as "Cubillejo del Sicio".

Monuments 

 Pairón de San Juan Bautista, a 17th century work, of which a reproduction now exists in the barrio de Salamanca of Madrid.
 Fuente de 1932.
 Iglesia de San Ildefonso, a 16th century Church.

References 

 Wikimedia Commons has a category relating to Cubillejo del Sitio.

Populated places in the Province of Guadalajara